Lake Gregory is a salt lake located in the Far North region of South Australia. The lake lies to the west of Lake Blanche;  to the east the Birdsville Track runs in between it and Lake Eyre.

Hydrology
Lake Gregory is fed by  local rainfall and by overflows from Lake Blanche to its east.  It was filled in 1974, 1984 and 1990.

Natural history

The lake is located within the boundaries of the 'Strzelecki Creek Wetland System', a DIWA wetland, and the Strzelecki Desert Lakes Important Bird Area.

History
It is named after the explorer Augustus Charles Gregory, who first passed by it in 1858. Originally Lake Eyre was named Lake Gregory by B. H. Babbage, but the names were modified by Governor Richard Graves MacDonnell, who preferred to name the former after the famous explorer who first investigated the region twenty years prior, Edward John Eyre.

Economy
The lands around the lake are used for pastoralism, with both sheep and cattle grazing the surrounding plains. Dulkaninna Station is located near the south west corner of the lake.

See also

 List of lakes of South Australia

References

Gregory
Far North (South Australia)